The Siamese pointy-tailed millipede, (Thyropygus allevatus), is a species of round-backed millipede in the family Harpagophoridae. It is found in Sri Lanka, Thailand and Vietnam.

References

External links
Molecular phylogeny of the Thyropygus allevatus group of giant millipedes and some closely related groups.
A revision of the Thyropygus allevatus group. Part V: Nine new species of the extended opinatus subgroup, based on morphological and DNA sequence data (Diplopoda: Spirostreptida: Harpagophoridae)
An initial systematics survey of the common harpagophorid millipede Thyropygus allevatus (Karsch, 1881) in Thailand

Spirostreptida
Millipedes of Asia
Animals described in 1881